Jewish Cemetery is a historic Jewish cemetery in Port Gibson, Mississippi.

History
The cemetery was established in 1871 by Louis Kiefer, Mayer Bock, and Moses Kaufman. Members of the Jewish Cemetery of Port Gibson Association paid an annual fee of US$2.50. They subsequently established a trust fund held by the Southern Mississippi Bank of Port Gibson. 

The cemetery has been listed on the National Register of Historic Places since July 22, 1979. It was restored in 1986.

References

External links
 

Cemeteries on the National Register of Historic Places in Mississippi
National Register of Historic Places in Claiborne County, Mississippi
Jewish cemeteries in Mississippi
1871 establishments in Mississippi